The 2010–11 CBA season is the 16th CBA season. Guangdong Southern Tigers won their fourth consecutive and overall seventh CBA title, defeating Xinjiang Flying Tigers in the Finals for a third year in a row, four games to two.

Changes
After a one-year suspension due to salary reasons, Yunnan Bulls were removed from the CBA.

All teams except Bayi Rockets can have two foreign players while the bottom 5 teams of last season have an extra right to sign an Asian player. Generally, Asian players are not counted as foreign players, and foreign players of each team can play no more than 6 quarters collectively each game. However, when facing Bayi Rockets, Asian players are counted as foreign ones while foreign players can play no more than 5 quarters collectively. Players from Hong Kong and Chinese Taipei are counted as domestic players in either situation.

Coaching changes

Regular Season Standings

All-star weekend

Rookie Challenge

 Guo Ailun was awarded the MVP of the game.

All-star game

 Quincy Douby was awarded the MVP of the game.

Slam Dunk Contest

 Singleton advanced to the final with 46 points in an extra dunk, in which Zhang Xuewen got 41 points.

Three-Point Shootout

 Unable to participate due to injury.

Skills Challenge

Playoffs

Teams in bold advanced to the next round. The numbers to the left of each team indicate the team's seeding in regular season, and the numbers to the right indicate the number of games the team won in that round. Home court advantage belongs to the team with the better regular season record; teams enjoying the home advantage are shown in italics.

Awards

Statistical leaders
Source

References

External links
Official Website 
163 CBA Coverage

 
League
Chinese Basketball Association seasons
CBA